Mount Institute, 1,538 ft., is a peak located in Hawley, Massachusetts, just south of the village of Charlemont.

History
Mount Institute was named by Horace Mann when he had an educational institute in Charlemont that overlooked the mountain.

In 1953, Arthur Parker started a small ski area called Thunder Mountain on the northwestern slope.  The rope tow served ski area would by closed by 1954. 

Parker reopened a greatly expanded Thunder Mountain Ski Area in 1961, served by a double chairlift.

Recreation

Thunder Mountain Ski Area was renamed Berkshire East Ski Resort at the end of the 1960s.  Berkshire East provides skiing, snowboarding, and snow tubing on Mount Institute in the winter months.

External links
  Mt. Institute Before Skiing - SkiBerkshireEast.com

Institute
Mountains of Franklin County, Massachusetts